The General Workers' Union of Germany (AAUD) was a factory organisation formed following the German Revolution of 1918–1919 in opposition to the traditional trade unions.

The AAUD was formed by the left communists  in the Communist Workers' Party of Germany (KAPD) who considered organising based on trades as being an outmoded form of organisation and instead advocated organising workers based on factories, thus forming the AAUD. They were influenced by the industrial unionism of the Industrial Workers of the World. The council communists organised these factory organisations as the basis for region-wide workers' councils.

A section of the AAUD led by Otto Rühle split from the AAUD, forming the Allgemeine Arbeiter-Union – Einheitsorganisation.

See also 
 Council communism
 Cuno strikes
 Factory committee
 Left communism
 Works council

References

External links 
 Program of the AAUD
 The Communist Left in Germany 1918-1921
 The Origins of the Movement for Workers' Councils in Germany
 Theses on the Role of the Party in the Proletarian Revolution
 Theses On The Fight Of The Working Class Against Capitalism
 Letter on Workers Councils

Communist organisations in Germany
Council communism
Labor in Germany
Labor history
Organizations of the German Revolution of 1918–1919